Film Polski (also Przedsiębiorstwo Państwowe Film Polski) was the state-run film production and distribution organization of Poland, founded in 1945.

History 

On November 13, 1945, the postwar communist government decreed the formation of Polski Film as a national enterprise.  Organized under the Minister of Culture Władysław Kowalski, Polski Film had control over both domestic film production and distribution of all foreign films.  In the first years there was still room for smaller production companies, notably Yiddish-language.

Aleksander Ford served as Film Polski's first director from 1945 to 1947.  As Roman Polanski noted in his autobiography, Ford was both an "extremely competent" manager and "a veteran party member, who was then an orthodox Stalinist. ...The real power broker during the immediate postwar period was Ford himself, who established a small film empire of his own."  With colleagues from the Polish United Workers' Party, Ford rebuilt the film production infrastructure, a national studio, and the National Film School in Łódź, which opened in 1948.  Ford taught at Łódź for twenty years.

Poland's first postwar feature was Leonard Buczkowski's musical of the German occupation, Zakazane piosenki (Forbidden Songs).  First released in January 1947 and very popular, in 1948 the film was re-edited and re-released, with more emphasis on Red Army's role as the liberator of Poland and the main ally of post-war Polish communist regime, as well as a more grim view of the German occupation of Warsaw and German brutality in general.  Jerzy Zarzycki's Unvanquished City was similarly re-edited to become more ideologically acceptable.

Film Polski was dissolved as of January 1, 1952, succeeded by the Centralny Urząd Kinematografii (Central Office of Cinematography).  In its important but brief history it released a total of thirteen feature films, along with dozens of short films and documentaries.

Productions 

Film Polski's output includes:

 Ostatni etap (The Last Stage), 1947, directed by Wanda Jakubowska
 Zakazane piosenki (Forbidden Songs), 1948, directed by Leonard Buczkowski
 Ulica Graniczna (Border Street), 1948, directed by Ford
 Skarb, 1949, directed by Leonard Buczkowski
 Robinson warszawski (Unvanquished City), 1950, directed by Jerzy Zarzycki
 Warszawska premiera (Warsaw Premiere), 1951, directed by Jan Rybkowski
 Mlodosc Chopin (Youth of Chopin), 1951, directed by Ford

References 

State-owned film companies
Mass media companies established in 1945
1945 establishments in Poland
Film distributors of Poland
Film production companies of Poland